A square root of a 2×2 matrix M is another 2×2 matrix R such that M = R2, where R2 stands for the matrix product of R with itself.  In general, there can be zero, two, four, or even an infinitude of square-root matrices. In many cases, such a matrix R can be obtained by an explicit formula.

Square roots that are not the all-zeros matrix come in pairs: if R is a square root of M, then −R is also a square root of M, since (−R)(−R) = (−1)(−1)(RR) = R2 = M.A 2×2 matrix with two distinct nonzero eigenvalues has four square roots. A positive-definite matrix has precisely one positive-definite square root.

A general formula
The following is a general formula that applies to almost any 2 × 2 matrix. Let the given matrix be

where A, B, C, and D may be real or complex numbers.  Furthermore, let τ = A + D be the trace of M, and δ = AD − BC be its determinant.  Let s be such that s2 = δ, and t be such that t2 = τ + 2s.  That is,

Then, if t ≠ 0, a square root of M is

Indeed, the square of R is 

Note that R may have complex entries even if M is a real matrix; this will be the case, in particular, if the determinant δ is negative.  

The general case of this formula is when δ is nonzero, and τ2 ≠ 4δ, in which case s is nonzero, and t is nonzero for each choice of sign of s. Then the formula above will provide four distinct square roots R, one for each choice of signs for s and t.

Special cases of the formula
If the determinant δ is zero, but the trace τ is nonzero, the general formula above will give only two distinct solutions, corresponding to the two signs of t.  Namely,

where t is any square root of the trace τ.

The formula also gives only two distinct solutions if δ is nonzero, and τ2 = 4δ (the case of duplicate eigenvalues), in which case one of the choices for s will make the denominator t be zero.  In that case, the two roots are

where s is the square root of δ that makes τ − 2s nonzero, and t is any square root of τ − 2s.

The formula above fails completely if δ and τ are both zero; that is, if D = −A, and A2 = −BC, so that both the trace and the determinant of the matrix are zero. In this case, if M is the null matrix (with A = B = C = D = 0), then the null matrix is also a square root of M, as is any matrix

where b and c are arbitrary real or complex values. Otherwise M has no square root.

Formulas for special matrices

Idempotent matrix
If M is an idempotent matrix, meaning that MM = M, then if it is not the identity matrix, its determinant is zero, and its trace equals its rank, which (excluding the zero matrix) is 1. Then the above formula has s = 0 and τ = 1, giving M and −M as two square roots of M.

Exponential matrix
In this case the square root is real.

Diagonal matrix
If M is diagonal (that is, B = C = 0), one can use the simplified formula

where a = ±√A, and d = ±√D. This, for the various sign choices, gives four, two, or one distinct matrices, if none of, only one of, or both A and D are zero, respectively.

Identity matrix
Because it has duplicate eigenvalues, the 2×2 identity matrix  has infinitely many symmetric rational square roots given by 

where  are any complex numbers such that

Matrix with one off-diagonal zero
If B is zero, but A and D are not both zero, one can use

This formula will provide two solutions if A = D or A = 0 or D = 0, and four otherwise.  A similar formula can be used when C is zero, but A and D are not both zero.

References

Matrices